Champagne et Caviar (Champagne and Caviar) is the eighth album by French rock singer Jacques Higelin, released in December 1979. It was initially released simultaneously as two separate albums titled Champagne pour tout le monde, (Champagne for everyone,) and Caviar pour les autres... (Caviar for everyone else...), but has since been released as a double album under its current title.

Reception

Commercial performance
Both halves of the album were commercially successful, being certified Gold the following year, in 1980.

Critical reception
The French edition of Rolling Stone magazine named it the 35th greatest French rock album.

Track listing

Personnel

Musicians
 Jacques Higelin: vocals, piano, clavinets, mandocello, salt box, sanza, accordion, banjo, guitar, synthesizer, organ, keyboards.
 Bernard Paganotti: bass guitar.
 Mickey Finn: guitars.
 Freddy Wall: guitars.
 Robbi Finkel: piano, keyboards.
 Bruce Yaw: bass guitar.
 Michael Suchorsky: drums.
 Laurent Thibault: synths, water drops.
 Ken Higelin: The Little Prince.
 Dominique Bouvier: drums, percussions.
 Richard Raux: brass.
 Les Frères Guillard: brass.
 Serge Derrien: mandolin, bel canto vocals.
 Élisabeth Wiener: vocals, background vocals.
 Geneviève McLaughlin: alto.
 Anny Flamer: violin.
 Earl Tubington: saxophone.
 Birds of the Château d'Hérouville: background chirps…
 Random noises: Concorde, toad of the Château d'Hérouville and Omer the myna.

Production
 Jacques Higelin: production.
 Laurent Thibault: recording, mixing and direction.
 Christian Orsini: mastering.
 David Farell: engineering.
 Étienne Dolet: direction.
 Bernard Prim: cover picture.
 Jean-Félix Galletti: cover design and concept.

References 

1979 albums
Jacques Higelin albums
Pathé-Marconi albums
EMI Records albums
Albums recorded at Studio in the Country